Elsamitrucin (elsamicin A) is a drug used in chemotherapy. Elsamitrucin is chemically related to chartreusin.

References 

Aminoglycoside antibiotics
Antineoplastic drugs
Phenols
Lactones